Dizbad-e Olya (also known as Dīzbād-e Bālā or Dizbad) is a village in Zeberkhan Rural District, Zeberkhan District, Nishapur County, Razavi Khorasan Province, Iran.

Geography 
Dizbad-e Olya is located at an altitude of 2020 metres in the southern area of the Binalud Mountains 97 kilometres southwest of the city of Mashhad and 71 kilometres northwest of Neyshabur. The highest point in the area is Mount Qajqor at 2881 m above sea level. The area of Dizbad-e Olya also borders the two neighbouring villages of Qasemabad and Hesar.

Demographics

Economy

History 
The historical background of Dizbad dates back to the year 714 AD. The name has changed many times throughout history. The oldest known name of Dizbad is Aspiduz, which includes the Persian words for horse and fort. In the ninth century it was known as Qasr al-Rih due to the Arab invasion. The origin of this name is due to the three forts that once served as a defense system, they signalled by smoke signals when enemies tried to invade. Only ruins of these forts remain. In later times, Dizbad was known as Chehel Ashkub. 

Due to its long history and cultural background, the identity of the people in this area has undergone many changes. One of the most impactful events that caused this cultural change was the opening of the Naser Khosrow School in 1939. The establishment of this school encouraged families to send their children to school, which had a positive effect and resulted in a growing number of children from the village graduating from school.

Climate

Gallery

References 

Populated places in Nishapur County